Carl Friedrich Weitzmann (10 August 1808 – 7 November 1880) was a German music theorist and musician.

Life and work
Weitzmann was born in Berlin and first studied violin in the 1820s with Carl Henning and Bernhard Klein. From 1827 to 1832 he studied composition in Kassel with Louis Spohr and Moritz Hauptmann.  In 1832 he founded a Liedertafel (a peculiarly German type of male singing society) in Riga (now in Latvia) with Heinrich Dorn. In Revel (now Tallinn, Estonia), he became music director of the opera where he composed three operas. From 1836 he began a ten-year association with the Saint Petersburg court orchestra. At this time he began to collect music books and folksongs. Weitzmann toured in Lappland and Finland (then part of the Russian empire) and performed with orchestras in Paris and London, returning to Berlin in 1848 to research music history and theory. In 1857 he took a teaching position with the Stern Conservatory (now part of the Berlin University of the Arts).

Weitzmann published his first major theoretical work Der übermässige Dreiklang (the augmented triad) in 1853. In this treatise, he suggested that the minor triad was merely an inversion of the major triad and that both are generated by a common fundamental tone in the middle. Weitzmann's demonstration of the efficacy of each of the four possible perfectly-even augmented triads in resolving to six major and minor triads each using single- or double-semitone displacement has been a significant influence on modern neo-Riemannian theorists.  In Weitzmann's own lifetime, composer Franz Liszt showed considerable interest in new theories regarding dissonant sonorities, referencing Weitzmann's "Der übermässige Dreiklang" in an analysis of his own Faust Symphony (a composition famously saturated with augmented triads). This has led to a strong conceptual association between Weitzmann's work and the Zukunftsmusik ("Music of the Future") for which he attempted to account.

Weitzmann later extended his theories to scales, noting how a descending minor scale starting from the fifth degree is an inversion of an ascending major scale. Because his theories relate major and minor, it is called a "dualist" explanation. Later dualist theorists include Arthur von Oettingen and the early work of Hugo Riemann.

Weitzmann differed from most theorists in his ideas of tuning and temperament. Most theorists viewed equal temperament as a compromise or a necessary evil. Weitzmann viewed it positively. He looked for acoustical properties of 12-note equal temperament, presumed enharmonic equivalence, and de-emphasized traditional rules of voice leading and treatment of dissonance leading to a theory where any chord can follow another chord.

His most lasting contribution to music theory (researched by contemporary American theorist Richard Cohn) concerns chord relations. Traditionally, a C-major triad was thought to be related most closely to a G-major triad through the circle of fifths and traditional tonic-dominant (V-I) resolution. Weitzmann suggested a-minor and e-minor triads were more closely related to C-major because they shared two common notes. This theory elegantly accounted for third relation and common tone progressions in earlier music of Schubert and Beethoven, and it paved the way for later chromatic composers who explored the compositional possibilities of tonal regions related by symmetrical augmented triads and diminished seventh chords.

Works

Der übermässige Dreiklang (Berlin, 1853) (The Augmented Triad)
Der verminderte Septimenakkord (Berlin, 1854) (The Diminished Seventh Chord)
Geschichte des Septimen-akkordes (Berlin, 1854) (History of Seventh Chords)
Geschichte der griechischen Musik (Berlin, 1855) (History of Ancient Greek Music)
Harmoniesystem (Leipzig, 1860, 2 cd printing 1895) (System of Harmony)
Die neue Harmonielehre im Streit mit der alten (Leipzig, 1860) (The Conflict between New and Old Harmonic Theory)
Geschichte des Clavierspiels und der Clavierlitteratur (History of Piano Playing and Piano Literature) (Stuttgart, 1863, expanded 1879); revised and edited by Max Seiffert as Geschichte der Klaviermusik (History of Piano Music) (Leipzig, 1899)

References

 Bowman, Edward Morris (1848–1913): Bowman's-Weitzmann's manual of musical theory (New York: W.A. Pond & co., 1879).http://babel.hathitrust.org/cgi/pt?id=uc1.b3563859
 Wason, Robert W., "Progressive Harmonic Theory in the Mid-Nineteenth Century" in Journal for Musicological Research, vii (1988) pp. 55–90
 Todd, R. Larry, "Franz Liszt, Carl Friedrich Weitzmann, and the Augmented Triad" in "The Second Practice of Nineteenth-Century Tonality" ed. William Kindermann and Harald Krebs (Lincoln: 1996), pp. 153–77
 Cohn, Richard, "Maximally Smooth Cycles, Hexatonic Systems, and the Analysis of Late Romantic Triadic Progressions," in "Music Analysis" xv (1996) pp. 9–40
 Cohn, Richard, "Weitzmann's Regions, My Cycles, and Douthett's Dancing Cubes," Music Theory Spectrum 22 (2000), 89 -103. 
 Wason, Robert W., "Carl Friedrich Weitzmann" in the New Grove Dictionary of Music and Musicians, ed. Stanley Sadie: Oxford, 2001.
 Hennig, Dennis, "Weitzmann and the Liszt Machine," Miscellanea Musicologica 16 (1989): 109 - 34.

1808 births
1880 deaths
Musicologists from Berlin
Pupils of Bernhard Klein
Pupils of Moritz Hauptmann
Pupils of Louis Spohr
German music theorists
19th-century German musicologists